Birds described in 1872 include the Chilean flamingo, snowy egret, black-tailed crake, Cyprus warbler, Baikal bullfinch, Persian shearwater, red-fronted antpecker, Tibetan serin, Newton's parakeet and the orange fruit dove.

Events
Allan Octavian Hume starts the quarterly journal Stray Feathers in 1872 supported by Ferdinand Stoliczka, who was an editor for the Journal of the Asiatic Society.
Henry Baker Tristram studies Bible localities and birds in Palestine.
Richard Bowdler Sharpe's main work was in classifying and cataloguing the collections of the British Museum but also played a major role in acquiring private collections by persuading wealthy collectors and travellers to contribute to the museum. In 1872 the museum had 35,000 bird specimens; the collection had grown to half a million by the time of his death.

Publications
Juan Ignacio Molina Saggio sulla Storia Naturale del Chili
Alphonse Milne-Edwards Resume des Recherches sur les Oiseaux Fossiles. C. R. vol. lxxiv. p. 1030, and Annales des Sciences Naturelles xvi. art. 2. [A resume of the principal discoveries made since 1856 in fossil birds, which the author' has embodied in his great work on this subject, now completed]. Translation as Investigations on Fossil Birds. Annals and Magazine of Natural History ser. 4. x. pp. 
Walter Buller A History of the Birds of New Zealand. London: Van Voorst (completed 1873)
Otto Finsch "Zur Ornithologie der Samoa-Inseln". Journal für Ornithologie 1872
George Ernest Shelley A Handbook to the Birds of Egypt (1872)
Carl Jakob Sundevall, 1872. Methodi naturalis avium disponendarum tentamen. Försök till fogelklassens naturenliga uppställning. Stockholm, Samson & Wallin online BHL

Ongoing events
Theodor von Heuglin Ornithologie von Nordost-Afrika (Ornithology of Northeast Africa) (Cassel, 1869–1875)
John Gould The Birds of Asia 1850-83 7 vols. 530 plates, Artists: J. Gould, H. C. Richter, W. Hart and J. Wolf; Lithographers: H. C. Richter and W. Hart
Henry Eeles Dresser and Richard Bowdler Sharpe  A History of the Birds of Europe, Including all the Species Inhabiting the Western Palearctic Region.Taylor & Francis of Fleet Street, London
The Ibis

References

"Sclater Index to the Ornithological Literature of 1872". Ibis. Wiley.

Bird
Birding and ornithology by year